Vadim Vyacheslavovich Tyurin (born 13 April 1971) is a Russian professional football coach and a former player.

Club career
He made his debut for PFC CSKA Moscow on 16 June 1990 in a Federation Cup game against FC Rotor Volgograd.

He played in the Russian Football National League for FC Sokol Saratov in 1992.

Honours
 Russian Third League Zone 5 top scorer: 1995 (25 goals).

References

1971 births
Sportspeople from Saratov
Living people
Soviet footballers
Russian footballers
Association football forwards
FC Sokol Saratov players
PFC CSKA Moscow players
FC SKA Rostov-on-Don players
Russian football managers